HD 143699 is a single star in the southern constellation of Lupus. It is a dim star but visible to the naked eye with an apparent visual magnitude of 4.90. It is most likely (90% chance) a member of the Upper Centaurus–Lupus subgroup of the Sco OB2 moving group.

This star has a stellar classification of B5/7 III/IV, suggesting it is an evolving star that is entering the giant stage. However, according to Zorec and Royer (2012) it is only 56% of the way through its main sequence lifespan. Helium-weak, it displays an underabundance of helium in its spectrum. Radio emissions have been detected from this source.

HD 143699 has 4.3 times the mass of the Sun and 4.4 times the Sun's radius. It has a high rate of spin with a projected rotational velocity of 123 km/s. The star is radiating 438 times the Sun's luminosity from its photosphere at an effective temperature of 14,521 K.

References

B-type subgiants
Helium-weak stars
Lupus (constellation)
Durchmusterung objects
143699
078655
5967